Philippe Diaz, is a French filmmaker and producer. He is best known as the director of critically acclaimed films The Empire in Africa, New World Order: Somewhere in Africa and Now & Later.

Personal life
He was born in Paris, France.

Career
He studied philosophy at the University of Sorbonne. In 1980, Díaz started to make several short documentaries, largely for companies. In 1985, he worked as the executive producer and founded his production company 'Films Plain Chant'. After the establishment of production company, he started to produce the film Havre in 1986, which was later followed by, Rue du Départ and Mauvais Sang.

In 1989, he produced his fourth feature film Pierre et Djemila which was directed by Gérard Blain. The film received official competition at the Cannes Film Festival as well. Then Diaz produced an English film in India: La Nuit Bengali. The film became the directorial debut for Nicolas Klotz and Hugh Grant. With this film, he started to make collaborations with American studios, especially Columbia Pictures. Immediately, New Line Cinema also contacted Diaz to co-fund and produce the film The Walraff Affair, a political thriller starring Jurgen Prochnow and Peter Coyote.

In 1991, he moved to Los Angeles and continued to produce social and political films. After 1995, he collaborated French and African-based films to American audiences. In 2001, he produced the film Heavy Metal 2000, a collaboration with Columbia. In 2001, he made his directorial debut with the documentary New World Order: Somewhere in Africa. Due to its success, he then made the film The Empire in Africa in 2006.

Filmography

References

External links
 

Living people
French film directors
French film producers
Year of birth missing (living people)